Arkansas Communication and Theatre Arts Association (ACTAA) is a non-profit professional organization serving educators and students of oral communication, debate, forensics, theatre arts, and dance the U.S. state of Arkansas.

National Forensic League Arkansas District 
Formed in 2011–12 school year, the National Forensic League (NFL) approved the creation of the Arkansas NFL District (No. 109) and its 13 charter schools to this forensics honor society.

Member schools 
 Fayetteville High School
 Bentonville High School
Cabot High School
 Little Rock Central High School
 Rogers Heritage High School
 Monticello High School
 Hall High School
 Omaha High School
 Rogers High School
 North Pulaski High School
 Jonesboro High School
 Bell Academy (Rogers, Arkansas)
 Cedarville High School
 North Little Rock High School (West Campus)
 North Little Rock High School (East Campus)
 Heber Springs High School
 Russellville High School
 Central Arkansas Christian Schools

In 2012–13, Episcopal Collegiate School gained membership to the Arkansas NFL District.

Sweepstakes awards 
District awards will be given in congress,  debate, and speech divisions . In addition to the overall district sweepstakes award, as listed below:
 
 2012–13: 
 1st Place: Bentonville HS
 2nd place: Monticello HS
 3rd place: Fayetteville HS

See also 

 Arkansas Activities Association

References

External links 
 

High schools in Arkansas
Student debating societies
Theatrical organizations in the United States